The men's field hockey tournament at the 1952 Summer Olympics was the seventh edition of the field hockey event for men at the Summer Olympics.

Medal summary

Results

Bracket

Preliminary round

Quarter-finals

Semi-finals

Bronze medal match

Gold medal match

Consolation round
There was also a consolation tournament played by the teams which were eliminated before the semi-finals. It is unknown if this part of the tournament was official and part of the Olympic Games because the official report did not show these matches in any kind.

5th–12th place quarter-finals

5th–8th place semi-finals

Fifth and sixth place

Participating nations
Each country was allowed to enter a team of 18 players and they all were eligible for participation. A total number of 191 players were entered, however only the 144 participants and six more players are known up to now. The official report for this Games also shows 144 competitors, but in the "Index of competitors" there are 147 players listed. The Austrian Hermann Knoll, the Belgian Jean-Jacques Moucq and the Polish Tadeusz Adamski did, according to the report itself, not compete in the main tournament. The Austrian player is not even shown as a competitor by the Austrian Olympic Committee database.

A total of 144(*) field hockey players from 12 nations competed at the Helsinki Games:
 
 
 
 
 
 
 
 
 
 
 
 

(*) NOTE: There are only players counted, which participated in the main tournament in one game at least.

Summary

There was also a consolation tournament played by the teams which were eliminated before the semi-finals. It is unknown if this part of the tournament was official and part of the Olympic Games because the official report did not show these matches in any kind. However, the teams are listed in order of the results of this consolation round.

References

External links
 Official Olympic Report

 
Field hockey at the Summer Olympics
1952 Summer Olympics events
Summer Olympics
1952 Summer Olympics